The 2010–11 Toronto CWHL season was the first season for the team that became known as the Toronto Furies at the end of the season. The Canadian Women's Hockey League underwent a restructuring prior to the 2010–11 CWHL season that led to the folding of three teams and the creation of a new Toronto team. It also head held its first draft in 2010 for its three Greater Toronto Area teams, where the Toronto CWHL team protected former Mississauga Chiefs' players Jennifer Botterill and Sami Jo Small. The Toronto team then proceeded to pick many other former Chiefs' players to make up the majority of the new team.

Draft

Protected players

Roster

Coaching staff
    General Manager: Barb Fisher
    Head Coach:  Dan Lichterman
    Assistant Coach: Joanne Eustace
    Assistant Coach: Bartley Blair
    Equipment Manager: Lester Tiu
    Head Athletic Therapist : Jennifer Bushell
    Assistant Athletic Therapist: Sharon Welsby
    Student Athletic Therapist: Carrie Alderdice

Regular season

Final standings
Note: GP = Games played, W = Wins, L = Losses, T = Ties, OTL = Overtime losses, GF = Goals for, GA = Goals against, Pts = Points.

Schedule

Postseason
March 27 Sunday: The final Game concluded with the Montreal Stars defeating Toronto  5 -0. Montreal got off to a  2 - 0 lead in the first period, The first goal was scored by Noémie Marin on a backhand from her off wing at the 14:47 minute mark, as she converted a pass from Caroline Ouellette. The second goal was scored at the 7:29 minute mark off a face off in the Toronto end. Toronto goalie Sami Jo Small played well in defeat  as Montreal controlled the game outshooting Toronto 51 to 26. Toronto did threaten offensively early in the game and could have turned the contest around but Montreal goalie, Kim St-Pierre,  came up with exceptional saves  to earn the shutout and ultimately crown Montreal Stars as the 2011 Clarkson Cup Champions.

See also
 2010–11 CWHL season
 2011 Clarkson Cup
 Toronto Furies
 Toronto Aeros
 Canadian Women's Hockey League

References

External links
    Toronto Furies on CWHL Website  
   Toronto Women's Hockey Club - CWHL

Toronto
Toronto Furies
Tor